The 2006 All-Ireland Intermediate Hurling Championship was the 23rd staging of the All-Ireland Intermediate Hurling Championship since its establishment by the Gaelic Athletic Association in 1961. The championship began on 14 May 2006 and ended on 26 August 2006.

Wexford entered the championship as the defending champions, however, they were beaten by Kilkenny in the Leinster final.

The All-Ireland final was played on 26 August 2006 at Fraher Field in Dungarvan, between Cork and Kilkenny, in what was their first meeting in the final in two years. Cork won the match by 3-15 to 1-18 to claim their sixth championship title overall and a first title since 2004.

Kilkenny's Eddie O'Donoghue was the championship's top scorer with 0-23.

Team summaries

Results

Leinster Intermediate Hurling Championship

Leinster final

Munster Intermediate Hurling Championship

Munster quarter-final

Munster semi-finals

Munster final

All-Ireland Intermediate Hurling Championship

All-Ireland semi-final

All-Ireland final

Championship statistics

Top scorers

Top scorers overall

Top scorers in a single game

References

Intermediate
All-Ireland Intermediate Hurling Championship